The brown-headed jewel-babbler (Ptilorrhoa geislerorum), also known as the dimorphic jewel-babbler or brown-capped jewel-babbler, is a jewel-babbler in the family Cinclosomatidae. It is now usually considered to be distinct from the blue jewel-babbler, separated altitudinally and by varying behaviour, calls and female plumage.

References

 Del Hoyo, J.; Elliot, A. & Christie D. (editors). (2007). Handbook of the Birds of the World. Volume 12: Picathartes to Tits and Chickadees. Lynx Edicions. 

Ptilorrhoa
Birds described in 1892